Hermopolis may refer to:

 Hermopolis (Hermopolis Magna), the capital of the 15th nome of Upper Egypt
 Hermopolis Parva, a large city of the 7th nome of Lower Egypt
 Hermopolis (Lower Egypt), the capital of the 15th nome of Lower Egypt
 Hermopolis (Butosos), a smaller city downstream from Butos
 Ermoupoli, the capital of Syros and Cyclades, Greece